Weekend Warriors is the fourth studio album by American hard rock musician Ted Nugent. It was released in September 1978 by Epic Records.

Description
Weekend Warriors was the first of three Ted Nugent studio albums to not feature Derek St. Holmes, following Holmes' departure in 1978. Instead, Charlie Huhn, the new vocalist and guitarist for Nugent, performed on this album and others until Holmes returned for Nugent in 1982. Founding bassist Rob Grange had left for good, citing the lack of credit for co-songwriting and suspicions about Nugent's creative accounting, which Grange alleged was building his hunting dynasty instead of paying the band.

The front sleeve-art was by British artist Jeff Cummins and was originally commissioned by Oui magazine, to accompany an interview with Nugent. Nugent liked what he saw and the artwork was recommissioned by CBS, with additional work being carried out for use as the album sleeve.

Track listing
All songs composed by Ted Nugent.

Personnel
Band members
 Ted Nugent – lead and rhythm guitars, lead vocals (on tracks 3, 8, 9, 10), backing vocals, bass (on track 10), percussion
 Charlie Huhn – lead vocals (on tracks 1, 2, 4, 5, 6, 7, 8), backing vocals, rhythm guitar (on track 2)
 John Sauter – bass (except where noted)
 Cliff Davies – drums, electronic drums, producer

Additional musicians
 David Hull – bass (on tracks 2, 5, 6, 8)

Production
 Lew Futterman, Tom Werman – producers
 Steve Klein – engineer
 Tim Geelan – engineer, mixing
 Kevin Ryan, Lou Schlossberg, Phil Giambaivo – assistant engineers

Charts

Album

Singles

Certifications

References

1978 albums
Ted Nugent albums
Albums produced by Tom Werman
Epic Records albums